The 2010–11 Sheffield Shield season was the 109th season of the Sheffield Shield, the first-class domestic cricket competition of Australia. The season began on 8 October 2010, and ended on 21 March 2011 at the Bellerive Oval, Hobart, with the Tasmanian Tigers winning their second shield.

Teams

Table

The top two teams after each round is played will compete for the Sheffield Shield final. The match will be contested at the home ground of the side that finishes first. In the result of a draw, the team that finished on top of the ladder, and hence hosting the match will be awarded the title. For an explanation of how points are awarded, see Sheffield Shield Points System.

Last Updated on 19 March 2011.

Fixtures and results

October

November

December

February

March

Final

Statistics

Most runs

Updated to end of competition

Highest scores

Updated to end of competition

Most wickets

Updated to end of competition

Best bowling

Updated to end of competition

See also
 2010–11 Australian cricket season

References

Sheffield Shield
Sheffield Shield
Sheffield Shield seasons